The Great American Economic Revival Industry Groups were created by U.S. President Donald Trump to combat the economic impact of the ongoing COVID-19 pandemic.

Trump originally proposed a second task force, following the White House Coronavirus Task Force. He later referred to the group as the "opening our country taskforce" and "opening our country council". Larry Kudlow and Steve Mnuchin were expected to be named members. Further details were expected to be announced in mid April 2020.

Members

Agriculture
 American Farm Bureau Federation – Zippy Duvall
 Sysco Corporation – Kevin Hourican
 Tyson Foods, Inc. – Dean Banks
 Perdue Farms, Inc. – Randy Day
 Cargill, Inc. – David MacLennan
 Archer-Daniels-Midland Company – Juan Luciano
 Corteva Agriscience – Jim Collins
 Tractor Supply Company – Hal Lawton
 Seaboard Corporation – Steven Bresky
 Grimmway Farms – Barbara Grimm
 Mountaire Farms – Ronnie Cameron

Banking
 Bank of America – Brian Moynihan
 JPMorgan Chase – Jamie Dimon
 Goldman Sachs – David Solomon
 Citigroup – Michael Corbat
 Wells Fargo – Charles Scharf
 U.S. Bancorp – Andrew Cecere
 Morgan Stanley – James Gorman
 Grand Rapids State Bank – Noah Wilcox
 Southern Bancorp – Darrin Williams

Construction, Labor, and Workforce
 International Union of Operating Engineers – Jim Callahan
 North America's Building Trades Unions – Sean McGarvey
 Laborers' International Union of North America – Terry O'Sullivan
 International Brotherhood of Teamsters – Jim Hoffa
 National Electrical Contractors Association – David Long
 Bechtel – Brendan Bechtel
 Fluor – Carlos Hernandez
 National Association of Home Builders – Jerry Howard
 Associated Builders and Contractors – Michael Bellaman
 Associated General Contractors – Stephen Sandherr
 AFL-CIO – Richard Trumka
 GH Palmer – Geoff Palmer
 American Council of Engineering Companies – Linda Bauer Darr

Defense
 Lockheed Martin – Marillyn Hewson
 Honeywell – Darius Adamczyk
 Northrop Grumman – Kathy Warden
 Raytheon – Gregory J. Hayes
 General Dynamics – Phebe Novakovic

Energy
 ExxonMobil – Darren Woods
 Continental Resources – Harold Hamm
 Chevron – Mike Wirth
 Southern Company – Tom Fanning
 Alabama Power – Mark Crosswhite
 ConocoPhillips – Ryan Lance
 Occidental Petroleum – Vicki Hollub
 Kinder Morgan – Steven Kean
 Hess Corporation – John Hess
 Perot Group and Hillwood – Ross Perot Jr.
 National Mining Association – Rich Nolan
 Valero – Joseph Gorder

Financial Services
 Blackstone – Stephen Schwarzman
 Paulson & Co. – John Paulson
 Citadel LLC – Kenneth Griffin
 Elliott Management – Paul Singer
 Vista Equity Partners – Robert Smith
 Fidelity Investments – Abigail Johnson
 Mastercard – Ajay Banga
 Visa – Al Kelly
 Chubb – Evan Greenberg
 Sequoia Capital – Doug Leone
 Stephens Inc. – Warren Stephens
 Charles Schwab – Chuck Schwab
 FIS Global – Gary Norcross
 TD Ameritrade – Todd Ricketts
 Intuit – Sasan Goodarzi

Food and Beverage
 National Restaurant Association – Marvin Irby
 McDonald's – Chris Kempczinski
 Darden Restaurants – Gene Lee Jr.
 Coca-Cola – James Quincey
 PepsiCo – Ramon Laguarta
 Chick-fil-A – Dan Cathy
 Subway – John Chidsey
 Bloomin' Brands – David Deno
 Yum! Brands – David Gibbs
 Papa Johns – Rob Lynch
 Wendy's – Todd Penegor
 Waffle House – Walt Ehmer
 Starbucks – Kevin Johnson
 Wolfgang Puck
 Thomas Keller
 Jean-Georges Vongerichten
 Daniel Boulud
 M Crowd Restaurant – Ray Washburne
 Jimmy John's – Jimmy John Liautaud
 Kraft – Carlos Abrams-Rivera
 National Association of Wholesaler-Distributors – Dirk Van Dongen
 International Franchise Association – Robert Cresanti
 Inspire Brands – Paul Brown

Healthcare
 NewYork-Presbyterian Hospital – Jerry Speyer
 HCA Healthcare – Sam Hazen
 Ascension Health – Joseph R. Impicciche
 CommonSpirit Health – Lloyd H. Dean
 Community Health Systems – Wayne Smith
 Trinity Health – Benjamin Carter
 Cardinal Health – Mike Kaufmann
 McKesson – Brian Tyler
 3M – Mike Roman
 Procter & Gamble – David S. Taylor
 Abbott Laboratories – Robert Ford
 Johnson & Johnson – Alex Gorsky
 Merck – Kenneth Frazier
 Pfizer – Albert Bourla
 Eli Lilly and Company – Dave Ricks
 Thermo Fisher Scientific – Marc Casper
 Gilead Sciences – Daniel O’Day
 AbbVie – Richard Gonzalez
 Regeneron – Leo Schleifer
 Biogen – Michel Vounatsos
 Roche Diagnostics – Matthew Sause
 Anthem – Gail Boudreaux
 UnitedHealth Group – David Wichmann
 Aetna – Karen Lynch
 Cigna – David Cordani
 Humana – Bruce Broussard
 Centene – Michael Neidorff

Hospitality
 Las Vegas Sands – Sheldon Adelson
 Marriott – Arne Sorenson
 Carnival – Micky Arison
 Hilton – Christopher Nassetta
 Hyatt – Mark Hoplamazian
 Wyndham Hotels & Resorts – Geoff Ballotti
 Intercontinental Hotels Group – Elie Maalouf
 Royal Caribbean – Richard Fain
 Norwegian Cruise Lines – Frank Del Rio
 Treasure Island Hotels – Phil Ruffin

Manufacturing
 Caterpillar – Jim Umpleby III
 Deere & Company – John May
 Cummins – Tom Linebarger
 Dow Inc. – Jim Fitterling
 Emerson Electric Company – David Farr
 General Electric – Larry Culp
 Tesla – Elon Musk
 Fiat Chrysler Automobiles – Mike Manley
 Ford Motor Company – Bill Ford
 General Motors Company – Mary Barra
 National Association of Manufacturers – Jay Timmons
 Pernod Ricard – Ann Mukherjee
 Nucor – Leon Topalian

Real Estate
 Simon Property Group – David Simon
 Caruso – Rick Caruso
 Vornado Realty Trust – Steven Roth
 Related Companies – Stephen Ross
 Blackstone – Jon Gray
 Irvine Company – Don Bren
 Starwood Capital Group – Barry Sternlicht
 Witkoff Group – Steve Witkoff
 Greystar – Bob Faith

Retail
 Walmart – Doug McMillon
 Home Depot – Craig Menear
 Home Depot – Ken Langone
 Home Depot – Bernie Marcus
 The Kroger Co. – Rodney McMullen
 Lowe's – Marvin Ellison
 Target – Brian Cornell
 CVS Health – Larry Merlo
 Rite Aid – Heyward Donigan
 Walgreens – Stefano Pessina
 Amazon – Jeff Bezos
 Menards – John Menard
 Best Buy – Hubert Joly
 Life Time Fitness – Bahram Akradi
 National Retail Federation – Matthew Shay

Technology
 Apple – Tim Cook
 Google (Alphabet Inc.) – Sundar Pichai
 Oracle – Larry Ellison
 Oracle – Safra Catz
 Salesforce – Marc Benioff
 SAP – Jen Morgan
 Microsoft – Satya Nadella
 Facebook – Mark Zuckerberg
 IBM – Arvind Krishna
 Intel – Bob Swan
 Qualcomm – Steven Mollenkopf
 Cisco – Chuck Robbins
 Advanced Micro Devices – Lisa Su
 Broadcom – Hock Tan
 Micron – Sanjay Mehrotra

Telecommunications
 Liberty Media – John Malone
 Verizon – Hans Vestberg
 T-Mobile – Mike Sievert
 Charter Communications – Tom Rutledge
 Comcast – Brian Roberts
 Altec – Lee Styslinger

Transportation
 FedEx – Fred Smith
 United Airlines – Oscar Munoz
 UPS – David Abney
 J. B. Hunt – John Roberts III
 YRC Worldwide – Darren Hawkins
 Crowley Maritime – Tom Crowley
 Uber – Dara Khosrowshahi
 DHL – Mike Parra
 LDJ Global Strategies – Louis DeJoy
 American Trucking Associations – Chris Spear

Sports
 NBA – Adam Silver
 MLB – Rob Manfred
 NFL – Roger Goodell
 UFC – Dana White
 PGA – Jay Monahan
 LPGA – Mike Whan
 USTA – Patrick Galbraith
 MLS – Don Garber
 WWE – Vince McMahon
 NASCAR – Lesa Kennedy
 NHL – Gary Bettman
 New England Patriots – Bob Kraft
 Dallas Cowboys – Jerry Jones
 Dallas Mavericks – Mark Cuban
 WNBA – Cathy Engelbert
 NWSL – Lisa Baird

Thought Leaders
 John Allison
 Kay Coles James
 Condoleezza Rice
 Art Laffer
 Steve Moore
 Steve Forbes
 Larry Lindsey
 Catherine Reynolds
 Jim DeMint
 Bill Hagerty
 Scott Gottlieb

References

Economic responses to the COVID-19 pandemic
Organizations established for the COVID-19 pandemic
Presidency of Donald Trump
U.S. federal government response to the COVID-19 pandemic